The Robert H. Terrell Law School was a historically black law school in Washington, D.C., that offered evening classes from its founding in 1931 until 1950. It was founded by George A. Parker, Philip W. Thomas, Louis R. Mehlinger, Benjamin Gaskins, Chester Jarvis, and Lafayette M. Hershaw after Howard University ended its evening law school program. The school was named after Robert Heberton Terrell, a longtime African-American judge of the District of Columbia Municipal Court (predecessor to the Superior Court of the District of Columbia), who died in 1925.

Parker had previously served as dean of the recently closed John M. Langston School of Law at Frelinghuysen University. Terrell Law School attracted other Langston faculty. During its 19 years of operation, the Terrell School educated the majority of black law students in the city. After graduating about 600 lawyers, it closed in 1950 as other law schools became integrated.

Alumni of Terrell Law School included:
 Austin L. Fickling, first black judge of the District of Columbia Court of Appeals
 Willie Stevenson Glanton, first black woman elected to the Iowa House of Representatives
 Ruby Hurley, civil rights leader
 John Oliver Killens, writer (did not graduate)
 Harry McAlpin, reporter
 Hubert B. Pair, judge of the District of Columbia Court of Appeals
 Wilhelmina Rolark, member of the Council of the District of Columbia

Faculty of Terrell Law School included:
 Belford Lawson Jr.,  attorney and civil rights activist
 Lafayette M. Hershaw, journalist and lawyer who co-founded the school and also served as president
 Austin L. Fickling
 Hubert B. Pair

References

Sources
 

African-American history of Washington, D.C.
Law schools in Washington, D.C.
Educational institutions established in 1931
Defunct private universities and colleges in Washington, D.C.
1931 establishments in Washington, D.C.
Educational institutions disestablished in 1950
1950 disestablishments in Washington, D.C.
Historically black law schools
Defunct law schools